Madjoari is a department of Kompienga Province, in the Est Region of Burkina Faso.

According to the 2006 census, there are 9,550 people living in the department.

Villes 
The department is made up of an administrative centre and seven villages.
 Madjoari is the administrative centre.

Villages 
 Gnobtenkoagou
 Kodjaari
 Matambima
 Momba
 Namounyouri
 Tambarga
 Tanli

References

Departments of Burkina Faso
Kompienga Province